Aeroflot Flight 7841 was a scheduled Soviet domestic passenger flight from Minsk to Leningrad (now Saint Petersburg), which crashed on 1 February 1985 killing fifty eight people on board. Twenty-two people (including three crew members) survived the accident. The crash was caused by engine failure brought on by ice ingestion. On 8 May 1985 the Tupolev Tu-134A was officially written off.

Aircraft
The Tupolev Tu-134A, registration number CCCP-65910, serial number 63969, involved in the accident was manufactured on 11 May 1982 and had 448 completed flight cycles prior to the accident, having entered service on 8 June 1982. Tu-134s are equipped with two tail-mounted Soloviev D-30 turbofan engines.

Crash
The crew levelled the wings and continued climbing, when the co-pilot reported a failure of the left engine to air traffic control. At 65 seconds after takeoff, an excessive vibration alarm indicated failure of the right engine. The aircraft was descending onto forest, with some trees up to 30 m in height. The aircraft continued hitting the trees and ultimately burned down except the aft portion.

Investigation
The investigation concluded that both engines failed due to ice ingestion, which led to compressor stall, destruction of the compressors and over-temperature of the turbine blades. Citing significant damage to the aircraft and engines, the investigators were unable to determine where the ice came from.

References

Accidents and incidents involving the Tupolev Tu-134
7841
Airliner accidents and incidents caused by engine failure
Aviation accidents and incidents in 1985
1985 in the Soviet Union
Aviation accidents and incidents in Belarus
Aviation accidents and incidents in the Soviet Union